Júlio Belém Airport  is the airport serving Parintins, Brazil. It is named after Júlio Furtado Belém (1911–1971), a local politician and member of the Amazonas State Assembly.

It is operated by the municipality of Parintins.

History
The airport was inaugurated in the 1980s as a replacement to an older facility located closer to the city center.

Every June, during the Parintins Folklore Festival, its traffic is greatly increased by charter and extra flights.

Airlines and destinations

Access

See also

List of airports in Brazil

References

External links

Airports in Amazonas (Brazilian state)